The 1976 Griffin Golden Helmet Trophy was a non-championship Formula Three race, held at the Mallory Park circuit, in Leicestershire, England, on 26 September.  The race saw Stephen South score his first International race victory.

Report

Entry
A total of 26 F3 cars were entered for the event, however of those, only seventeen took part in qualifying and race. Of the nine, who were entered, but did not arrive included the BARC BP Super Visco British F3 Champion, Rupert Keegan.

Qualifying
Stephen South took pole position, ahead of Brazilian Paulo Gomes. Another Brazilian, Aryon Cornelsen-Filho took third with Geoff Lees completing the second row of the grid.

Race
After 18 laps of the Mallory Park circuit, South took the chequered flag, in a time of 13:35.4 mins., averaging a speed of 107.28 mph. Second place went to Lees, who was just 1.4secs behind. Gomes was a little further adrift in third, completed the podium.

Classification

Race

 Fastest lap: Stephen South & Geoff Lees, 44.6secs.

References

British Formula Three Championship
Formula Three races